AL1 may refer to:

 Four-Phase Systems AL1, the first microprocessor (1969), produced by Four-Phase Systems
 AL1, original designation of British Rail Class 81
 A designation for main-belt asteroids
 AL1, a postcode district in the AL postcode area
 Al1, mini album of South boy group Seventeen

See also
 Futurama#Language